Charles Victor Roman (July 4, 1864 – August 25, 1934) was a surgeon, professor, author and civil rights activist born in Williamsport, Pennsylvania and raised in Dundas, Ontario. He was the first Black person to graduate from Hamilton Collegiate Institute, a high school located in Hamilton, Ontario.

Early life 
Charles Roman was the fourth child of James William Roman and Anne Walker McGuinn. 

His father was an enslaved man that escaped to Canada from Maryland via the Underground Railroad and his mother was the daughter of two enslaved Americans who escaped to Canada and later became successful farmers and landowners in Burford, Ontario. 

US census documents indicate that Charles parents lived in Williamsport, Pennsylvania with their children (which would come to include Charles) sometime before 1860. The census also indicates that James also worked as the captain of a canal boat while living in Pennsylvania. 

His parents would move to Burford, Ont in 1870 when Victor was six years old  and then later to Dundas, Ontario in 1867 for work opportunities.

Charles, then 12,  found work at the Cotton Company, an industrial mill formerly known as the Cotton Factory based in Hamilton. Despite being very young, it was legal for children to work in industrial complexes and factories at the time. Charles would often work 12 hour days and then attend night school or supplement his learning with trips to the library when possible. 

At 17, Roman was injured in a workplace accident at the mill and his leg was amputated.

This accident forced Charles to leave his job, but allowed him to focus on his education. He enrolled in a four-year program at Hamilton Collegiate Institute, which he was able to complete in only two years.

Career

Teaching 
After graduation, Roman found it hard to find gainful employment in his field due to racial discrimination and his disability, so he sold sewing items to save money for medical school. In 1885, a traveling lecturer convinced Charles to use his degree from Hamilton Collegiate Institute and education to find work as a teacher in the U.S. where he could earn more money.  

He later moved to Trigg County, Kentucky, and then Nashville, Tennessee to teach public school. He intended to save enough money to return to Canada and attend medical school. While teaching, he also took classes at Meharry Medical College and graduated in 1890.

Medicine 
After graduating Meharry Medical College he married his wife Margaret Lee Voorhees and he worked for two years in Clarksville. He operated his own private practice in Dallas from 1893 to 1904. He paused his practice to further pursue studies at the Post-Graduate Medical School of Chicago, and study ophthalmology and otorhinolaryngology in London. He was the first African American physician to train in both of those disciplines. 

He returned to Meharry Medical College after his graduation to teach ear, eye, nose and throat diseases, as well as surgical technique. While working as a professor, he earned a Master of Arts in history and philosophy in 1913 from Fisk University, where he later became the head of the Department of Health.

Roman was the fifth president of the National Medical Association, and edited the association's Journal of the National Medical Association for ten years, until 1919.

Lecturer 
Roman worked with the US Army during World War I as a medical lecturer where he spoke primarily to African American soldiers.

Activist 
In 1919, Roman was the associate editor of The National Cyclopedia of the Colored Race. He also worked with several organizations that dealt with race relations and peace, including the American Academy of Political and Social Science, Southern Sociological Congress, Knights of Pythias and the Odd Fellows. At the African Methodist Episcopal Church, he also held the position of lay leader. He wrote many books and articles, and one of his addresses to the Southern Sociological Congress about race relations earned him accolades in journals such as the Journal of the National Medical Association.

Personal life 
Roman and his wife did not have children, but he shared a bond with his nephew Charles Lightfoot Roman who went on to attend McGill University.

References 

American surgeons